Mobile Legends: Bang Bang Professional League Philippines (MPL-PH) is a professional Esports league for the game Mobile Legends: Bang Bang in the Philippines. MPL Philippines is the direct route of qualified teams to both the Mobile Legends World Championships and Mobile Legends: Bang Bang Southeast Asia Cup. MPL Philippines currently follows a franchise-based system, wherein eight teams are currently competing as and officially removing local team qualifiers, previously evident during MPL Philippines Season 7.

Established in 2018, there have been six teams that have won the championship title of MPL Philippines, with two teams being back-to-back champions in Sunsparks and Blacklist International. Three of the eight teams from MPL-PH have as well won the Mobile Legends World Championship title: Bren Esports, Blacklist International. and recently crowned ECHO Philippines. MPL Philippines has a "split" season system wherein a year is split into two seasons

MPL Philippines has been considered to be the "strongest" Mobile Legends region after it had produced three world champions, winning three consecutive world championship titles in 2022.

History 
The first MPL Philippines playoffs tournament was held in SM Mall of Asia Music Hall from June 30 to July 1, 2018. The number of esports teams were reduced to eight to fight for the $50,000 cash prize. In the end, Aether Main became the first team to win the inaugural championship of MPL Philippines.

In March 2020, the COVID-19 pandemic hit the Philippines. It marked the fifth season of MPL Philippines as the first offline MPL-PH tournament that was unable to have a live audience due to the surge of COVID-19 cases in the country. In the same season, the team Sunsparks made history for becoming the first team in MPL Philippines history to win back-to-back championship titles, defeating ONIC Philippines in two-consecutive seasons.

Season 1 (2018) 
MPL Philippines was established in 2018 with a qualifying stage for competing teams from the entire country rather than having the franchise-based system that MPL Philippines Season 8 and onwards will be following. The very first season of MPL Philippines was won by the team Aether Main, overseen by the leader, AkoSiDogie.

In the same year, Aether Main was acquired by Bren Esports and would play as the name Aether Main in MSC 2018, where they would eventually win the title.

Season 2 (2018) 
MPL Philippines Season 2 was the first and so-far only MPL Philippines Season to have been held in two different years from October 2018 and finishing in January 2019. MPL Philippines Season 2 would see a new Champion to take the title from Aether Main, Cignal Ultra esports, defeating Bren Esports in the Grand Finals.

Season 3 (2019) 
MPL Philippines Season 3 would as well be held on 2019, a few months after MPL Philippines Season 2. Bren Esports would regain a spot in the Grand Finals, yet was ultimately defeated by the darkhorse team in Arkangel.

Season 4 (2019) 
MPL Philippines Season 4 was seen to be the beginning of the imminent rivalries between specific teams. MPL Philippines Season 4 saw ONIC Philippines play in the Grand Finals against Sunsparks. With a 2-1 series lead in the Finals, it was seen that ONIC was favoured to win the Championship, however, at a clutch defense on the base of Sunsparks by Rafflesia, sent the series into Game 5 after a minion wave would ultimately end the Game in favour of Sunsparks. The team would immediately win the Championship title after winning Game 5.

Season 5 (2020) 
MPL Philippines Season 5 became the first edition of the league to be held online without a live audience due to COVID-19 pandemic that had hit the country on the same year. MPL Philippines Season 5 would ultimately see a rematch between ONIC Philippines and the defending champions of Sunsparks however, Sunsparks would ultimately win the Finals in a 3-1 series, making them the first team in MPL PH History to win back-to-back championship titles.

Season 6 (2020) 
MPL Philippines Season 6 would become the second edition of the league to have its tournaments held online. The sixth season saw the teams of MPL Philippines that we are currently having in the upcoming MPL Philippines Season 9. Ultimately, Bren Esports would win their first MPL Philippines title, defeating Omega Esports in 6 games, making MPL Philippines Season 6 the first edition to introduce a best-of-seven matchup.

Both teams alongside another Aura Philippines (now ECHO Philippines), Blacklist International, Execration and ONIC Philippines would compete in the ONE Esports MPL Invitational 2020, a regional competition in Southeast Asia. Bren Esports would eventually lose in a 0-3 sweep by Indonesia's Alter Ego.

Bren Esports and Omega Esports would then represent the Philippines in the M2 World Championships as both the champions and runner-up for MPL Philippines Season 6. Bren Esports would go on to win the championship title after a close 7-game series against Myanmar's Burmese Ghouls.

Season 7 (2021) 

MPL Philippines Season 7 would foresee one of the biggest "win-win" trades for two teams in Blacklist International and ONIC Philippines where ONIC's dynamic duo in "VeeWise" of Johnmar "OhMyV33nus" Villaluna and Danerie James "Wise." Del Rosario would be traded to Blacklist, in return of rookie jungler Kairi "Kairi" Rayodelsol. Blacklist International would then win the Championship against Execration, despite being down 1-3 during Game 5.

Both Blacklist and Execration would represent the Philippines in the Mobile Legends: Bang Bang Southeast Asia Cup in Singapore, commonly known as MSC 2021. Execration would eventually defeat Blacklist in a 1-4 series.

Season 8 (2021) 

MPL Philippines Season 8 would become the first season in MPL Philippines to become a franchise-league system, ultimately removing the team qualifying rounds that would begin prior to the season. Having been favoured to win back-to-back titles, Blacklist International would eventually see themselves in the Grand Finals against the Upper-Bracket champions of ONIC Philippines. Blacklist was eliminated during the first round of the Upper-Bracket after a 1–3 series loss against Omega Esports and the absence of Kiel Calvin "OHEB" Soriano after getting suspended.

Blacklist International would make history, becoming the second team in MPL Philippines to win back-to-back titles, after defeating ONIC Philippines in 5 games. Blacklist International would eventually represent the Philippines, alongside ONIC Philippines in the M3 World Championships to be held in Singapore.

Prior to the World Championships, Blacklist International and ONIC Philippines, accompanied by Omega Esports, ECHO Philippines, RSG Philippines and Nexplay EVOS, would compete in ONE Esports MPL Invitational 2021. Blacklist International would eventually secure the Grand Finals position, however, was defeated by ONIC Esports of Indonesia in a 1–3 series.

Blacklist International and ONIC Philippines would begin their M3 World Championship run in dominance however, Blacklist would be eliminated from the upper-bracket contention by the North American team BloodThirstyKings (BTK). ONIC Philippines would go 9-0 in the Upper-Bracket and would secure the Upper-Bracket Grand Finals spot, whereas Blacklist International would defeat BTK in a rematch for the lower-bracket Grand Finals spot in a 3–1 series, ultimately making M3 the second M-Series to be battled by the two teams of a single country, the first being M1 by EVOS Esports and RRQ Hoshi of Indonesia. 

Blacklist International would win the M3 World Title in a 4–0 sweep against ONIC Philippines.

Season 9 (2022) 

MPL Philippines Season 9 would become the second season in MPL Philippines to have a franchise-based system alongside being the fifth edition of the tournament to be held online due to the Covid-19 Pandemic. MPL Philippines Season 9 would resume with a live-audience during its playoffs and would determine the representatives of the Philippines at MSC 2022 in Kuala Lumpur.

RSG Philippines would win the MPL PH S9 Title, defeating the reigning MSC Champions Smart Omega in a 4-1 Grand Finals. In MSC 2022 RSG Philippines would find themselves facing off their co-country representatives, Smart Omega in the lower bracket finals after losing in a match against The Indonesian Giants, RRQ Hoshi. With a close series of 4-3, RSG Ph would come out as the victors of Game 7 against Smart Omega, they would then eventually win a revenge series against RRQ Hoshi in the Grand finals in a dominating fashion of 4-0.

Season 10 (2022) 

MPL Philippines Season 10 was the third season of MPL Philippines to have a franchise-based system. It started on August 12 and held offline at the ICite Building Auditorium in Bagumbayan, Quezon City. The tournament makes it as the first MPL Philippines tournament since the start of COVID-19 pandemic to feature audiences for both regular season and playoffs. The tournament determined the representatives of Philippines at the annual M4 World Championships, which eventually led to Blacklist International and ECHO Philippines' qualification to the worlds.

MSC 2022 Champions RSG Philippines were unable to defend their title for this season, as Blacklist International returns for a comeback, winning the MPL Championship 4-2 against ECHO Philippines despite going down to a 2-1 deficit during Game 3.

Season 11 (2023) 

MPL Philippines Season 11 will be the fourth season of MPL Philippines to have a franchise-based system. It shall begin on February 17, 2023. The tournament shall determine the country's participants for the upcoming MSC 2023.

Current Teams and Rosters 
*As of February 21, 2023; Bold Text denotes as new roster additions

Reference:

Results

By Team

Player Awards and Achievements 

Reference:

MPL Philippines Hall of Legends 
In commemoration of the tenth season of MPL Philippines, on September 5th, 2022, MPL Philippines announced that the nominations for the ten new inductees for the Hall of Legends were officially opened. The nominations and voting process lasted for an entire month and two days, ending on October 7, 2022. 

On Sunday, October 23, 2022, the official inductees were announced on stage before the introduction of the Grand Finalists for MPL Philippines Season 10. The inductees were announced by the following:

An extra inductee was announced onstage when Manjean Faldas was to become the eleventh member of the Hall of Legends. Faldas has been part of MPL Philippines and has been casting MPL Philippines games since Season 1 and is widely known for his tandem partner "ManjeanBoo" at the time together with Shin boo "Shinboo" Ponferrada .

Reference:

References 

Mobile Legends: Bang Bang competitions
Esports competitions in the Philippines